Mitino is a rural locality (a village) in Kiprevskoye Rural Settlement, Kirzhachsky District, Vladimir Oblast, Russia. The population was 2 as of 2010. There are 4 streets.

Geography 
Mitino is located 21 km east of Kirzhach (the district's administrative centre) by road. Khalino is the nearest rural locality.

References 

Rural localities in Kirzhachsky District